Adriatique is an electronic music producer and DJ duo from Zürich, Switzerland, consisting of Adrian Shala and Adrian Schweizer. They first met in 2008 and have been producing and playing electronic music as Adriatique since 2009, mainly house and techno.

Career
In 2016 they founded a record label and platform for the arts called Siamese, which releases their own music as well as productions by others. Siamese has released music by Luca Ballerini, Ed Davenport, Sebastian Mullaert and Eduardo De La Calle.

Adriatique are also signed to Diynamic and Afterlife (Tale Of Us’ label). On Tuesday 11 September 2018 Adriatique announced their debut album ‘Nude’ would be released on Afterlife on 26 October 2018. Past releases include EPs for Cityfox and Culprit, as well as remixes for Moby, DJ Hell, M.A.N.D.Y, Marc Romboy and Stephan Bodzin.

In 2017, Adriatique recorded a BBC Radio 1 Essential Mix. They have also won three Swiss nightlife awards.

Awards 
 Swiss Nightlife Award (2018)

Discography 

Releases:

2023 Beyond Us (Hatsheput Version) - Cercle Records

2022 All I Ever Wanted EP - Siamese

2022 Live and Love EP - Siamese

2022 Arcade Mode - DGTL

2020 Home - Siamese

2019 X - Siamese

2018 Nude - Afterlife

2018 Grinding Rhythm - Siamese Anthology II - Siamese

2018 Ray - Afterlife

2017 Something In Between - Siamese Anthology I - Siamese

2016 Soul Valley EP - Cityfox

2016 Patterns Of Eternity EP - Siamese

2016 Jekaterinburg - 10 Years Diynamic Compilation - Diynamic Music

2014 Space Knights - Cityfox

2014 Rollox EP - Diynamic Music

2014 Midnight Walking EP - Culprit L A

2013 Lophobia EP - Diynamic Music

2013 Catch The Light – Diynamic Music

2012 Trigger Dance - Culprit L A

2012 Son Of A Cheater - Cityfox

2012 Roads - Diynamic Music

2012 Life Is A Pitch - Cityfox

2012 Feeling Good EP - Off Recordings

2012 Face to Face EP - Culprit LA

2012 Bodymovin' EP - Diynamic Music

2012 All The Ladies - Wolf & Lamb

2011 The L. Way - Diynamic Music

2011 Deep In The Three - 2DIY4

Remixes:

2022 Nuage - Orbit (Adriatique & Aether Remix) - House of Youth

2022 Swedish House Mafia - Moth To A Flame (Adriatique Remix) - SSA Recording

2022 Rüfüs Du Sol - On My Knees (Adriatique Remix) - Reprise Records

2022 Stephan Bodzin - River (Adriatique Remix) - Herzblut Recordings

2022 WhoMadeWho - Silence & Secrits (Adriatique Remix) - Embassy One

2021 Shiffer - Memento (Adriatique Remix) - Siamese

2020 Matthew Dekay - Heimreise (Adriatique Remix) - Siamese

2020 Howling, RY X, Frank Wiedemann - Need You Now (Adriatique Remix) - Counter Records

2020 Mathame - Never Give Up (Adriatique Remix) - B1 Recordings GmbH

2017 Tale Of Us, Vaal - Monument (Adriatique Remix) - Afterlife

2017 Andre Lodemann - Birth (Adriatique Remix) - Best Works Records

2016 Moby - Wait For Me (Adriatique Remix) - 2DIY4

2016 Marc Romboy, Stephan Bodzin - Atlas (Adriatique Remix) - Systematic Recordings

2015 WhoMadeWho - Dreams (Adriatique Remix) - Fayer

2015 Of Norway feat. Linnea Dale - Spirit Lights (Adriatique Remix) - Connaisseur

2015 Butch feat. Hohberg - The Spirit (Adriatiques 7am Remix) - Watergate Records

2014 Thyladomid feat. Mâhfoud - The Real Thing (Adriatique Remix) - Diynamic Music

2014 Flowers & Sea Creatures - Very Next Day (Adriatique Remix) - My Favourite Robot

2013 M.A.N.D.Y. & Lopazz - Feel it in your Brain (Adriatique Remix) - Cityfox

2013 Kraak & Smaak - The Future Is Yours (Remixes) - Jalapeño

2013 Gorje Hewek & Ishevski - Voltiger (Adriatique Remix) - Highway Rec

2013 Edu Imbernon - Fayer (Adriatique Remix) - Culprit LA

2012 Nhan Solo - I Wanna Be High (Adriatique Remix) - Mother

2012 Finnebassen - Footsteps (Adriatique Remix) - Supernature

2012 Daniel Kyo - All I Want (Adriatique Remix) - Drumpoet

References

Swiss electronic music groups
2009 establishments in Switzerland
Musical groups established in 2009